Mizda was one of the districts of Libya. In the 2007 reorganization of Libyan districts its territory became part of Jabal al Gharbi District.

Prior to 2007 Mizdah bordered the following districts:
Bani Walid - northeast
Sirte - east
Al Jufrah - southeast 
Wadi Al Shatii - south
Ghadames - west
Nalut - northwest, south of Yafran
Yafran - northwest, north of Nalut
Gharyan - north
Tarhuna wa Msalata - northeast, at a quadripoint

At the time Mizda bordered more districts than any other Libyan district.

Settlements
The following are important settlements in the former Mizda District:
Mizda (مزدة) a town at 31° 25' 20"N  12° 57' 0"E
Nasmah (-نسمة) a village at 31° 23' 0 N  13° 17' 0 E
Bi'r Abu al Ghurab or Abu West (أبو الغرب) a village at 30° 38' 0 N 13° 36' 0 E 
Al Qaryah al Gharbīyah  (القرية الغربية) at 30° 24' 24" N  13° 25' 14" E
Tabaqa (طبقة) at 30° 25' 53" N  13° 19' 7" E 
Ash Shuwayrif or Esc Sciuere (الشويرف) at 29° 59' 20" N  14° 15' 20" E
Fessano or Fisānū (فسانو) also Fessano Almchachep (منطقة فسانو) or Sawani Fassanu at 31° 18' 19" N   12° 47' 42" E
Qaryat (القرية الشرقية) at 30° 23' 17" N   13° 34' 50" E
Ash Shaqiqa (الشقيقة) a village at 31° 38' 22" N   12° 48' 24" E

Notes

Former districts of Libya